Geevarghese Mar Theophilos is a Metropolitan of the Malankara Orthodox Syrian Church.

Early life
H. G. Geevarghese Mar Theophilos was born on 8 August 1971.

Metropolitan
He was elected as the Metropolitan candidate on 25 February 2022 at the Malankara Association held at Kolenchery. He was consecrated as Metropolitan on 28 July 2022 at St. Mary's Orthodox Cathedral, Pazhanji.

References

1971 births
Living people
Malankara Orthodox Syrian Church bishops